Hertzog is a German surname, which is a variant of Herzog. Hertzog may also refer to:

People
 Albert Hertzog (1899-1982), South African politician
 Corey Hertzog (born 1990), American soccer (football) player
 Enrique Hertzog (1896–1981), was  president of Bolivia, 1947–1949
 James Barry Munnik Hertzog (1866-1942), prime minister of South Africa
 Lawrence Hertzog, American television writer and creator of Nowhere Man

Places
 Hertzog, Eastern Cape, South Africa
 Hertzogville, farming town in the Free State of South Africa

Others
Hertzog Prize, South African literary prize for Afrikaans literature

See also
Herzog

German-language surnames
Afrikaans-language surnames